"Go Up" is a song recorded by Filipino boy band SB19, released on July 26, 2019, as the second single of their debut album Get in the Zone. It was written by all of the members of the group and produced by Oh Won Lee and Glow. It has won Song of the Year in Myx Music Awards and Pop Performance of the Year in Wish Music Awards.

Background and release 
After the lukewarm reception of their debut single "Tilaluha", SB19 had almost decided to quit and go on separate ways. Josh shared reasons which is about how hard for performers in the country to earn money for a living as well as the stress in training. They dedicate everything they experienced on their second single "Go Up" which they described as their "last shot". Each of the members dedicated for whom they go up for: Justin goes up for himself first so that he can start helping others; Ken goes up for his goals; Stell said he goes up for his family because of their unending support; Josh goes up for himself sharing his terrible childhood history; Pablo go up for himself, family, and everyone who believes in him.

The song was released on July 19, 2019 which was written by Pablo and produced by Korean composer Han Tae Soo. It was released first by the group before "Alab (Burning)" instead even it was already finished recording. After a couple of months being released, "Go Up" received very minimal reception and the group already decided to stop. However, on September 2, 2019, a fan posted the dance practice video on Twitter and Facebook, promoting the group and saying that she "didn't feel any cringe at all" while listening to the song. Her post quickly gained traction, and after that, SB19 became viral giving them their career breakthrough.

Cover versions and usage 
Torch sisters, a group of five young American girls, did a sing and dance cover of "Go Up" in Tagalog language. In the second episode of BBTV, Ben&Ben's YouTube series, the band did a "Spin the Wheel" challenge to other OPM songs but to random music genres where they performed "Go Up" in reggae version. JM Yosures performed the song as a contest piece in Tawag ng Tanghalan which he was declared as the champion; later, he sang it again on Sunday noontime show ASAP. A version of the song with modified lyrics was used by Netflix Philippines for Netflix PH "Catch Up" featuring the group while Lucky Me Philippines used modified lyrics for "Go Cup" jingle promoting Hot Cheese Ramyun and Jjamppong noodle flavors.

Live performances 
The song was performed on various areas in the Philippines as one of the setlist of the group in their nationwide Get in the Zone concert. SB19 performed "Go Up" live on the 5th Wish Music Awards in which the song won the Wishclusive Pop Performance of the Year. On October 11, 2020, they performed in the YouTube Fan Fest stage virtually with "Love Goes" and "Go Up" remixes. Included also in the setlist on their first online concert are songs in the Get in the Zone with "Go Up" as an encore show. On 2020 year-end, the group performed "Hanggang sa Huli", "Alab", "Go Up", "Ikako", and Pepsi commercial jingle "Sundin ang Puso" at Bye2020 concert.

Credits and personnel 
Credits adapted from Tidal, JASRAC and music video.

 Oh Won Lee – producer, composer, arranger
 Ju Hyeong Lee – producer, composer, arranger
 John Paulo Nase – vocals, songwriting
 Justin de Dios – cover art design, vocals, songwriting
 Geong Seong Han – executive producer, arranger
 Park Jung Un – mastering engineer
 Xi-Anne Avancena – cover art design
 Stellvester Ajero – vocals, songwriting
 Josh Cullen Santos – vocals, songwriting
 Felip Jhon Suson – vocals, songwriting

Accolades

Release history

References 

2019 singles
2018 songs
SB19 songs
Taglish songs
Sony Music singles